Dodo Knyphausen is the name of:
Dodo zu Innhausen und Knyphausen (1583–1636), Field Marshal of Sweden
Dodo von Knyphausen (1641–1698), official of Brandenburg-Prussia